Sterling (1868 – 26 March 1891) was a British racehorse and sire. Although he was not particularly successful in terms of major wins he was very highly regarded, being rated by his jockey Harry Custance as the equal of Thormanby.

Background
Sterling was a bay horse bred and owned by the Graham family who owned the Yardley Stud near Birmingham. His dam, Whisper, was bred by Mr. R. Taylor and produced ten foals between 1866 and her death in 1882. Sterling was her third foal and one of six sired by Oxford. Whisper's other good racers included Playfair.

Racing career
Sterling won five races including the Liverpool Autumn Cup at Aintree Racecourse. He also finished second to Bothwell in the 2000 Guineas at Newmarket on 25 April 1871. In the autumn of 1871, the owner of the Belmont Stakes winner Harry Bassett's owner issued a challenge to the owner of Sterling for a one and a half mile match race at level weights, to be run in the United States. Sterling's owner responded by offering to put up £12,000 to the American's £8,000, but only if the match took place in England. The race never materialised.

Stud career
Sterling was much more successful as a breeding stallion than he had been as a racehorse.  

Sterling died on 26 March 1891 at 23.

Pedigree

References

Racehorses bred in the United Kingdom
Racehorses trained in the United Kingdom
1868 racehorse births
1891 racehorse deaths
Thoroughbred family 12-a